The Nuwaubian Nation, Nuwaubian movement, or United Nuwaubian Nation is an American new religious movement founded and led by Dwight York, also known as Malachi Z. York. York began founding several black Muslim groups in New York in 1967. He changed his teachings and the names of his groups many times, incorporating concepts from Judaism, Christianity, UFO religions, New Age, and many esoteric beliefs.

In the late 1980s, he abandoned the black Muslim theology of his movement in favor of Kemetism and UFO religion. In 1991, he took his community to settle in Upstate New York, then they moved near to Eatonton, the county seat of Putnam County in Georgia. His followers built an ancient Egypt-themed compound called "Tama-Re" and changed their name to the "United Nuwaubian Nation of Moors."

By 2000, the "United Nuwaubian Nation of Moors" had some 500 adherents. They drew thousands of visitors for "Savior's Day" (York's birthday, June 26). Adherence declined steeply after York was convicted of numerous counts of child molestation, as well as racketeering and financial reporting violations, and sentenced to 135 years in federal prison in April 2004. The Tama-Re compound was sold under government forfeiture and demolished. The Southern Poverty Law Center described York as a "black supremacist cult leader", and has designated the Nuwaubian Nation as a hate group.

The group has taken numerous names throughout its history, including "Ansaru Allah Community", "Holy Tabernacle Ministries", "United Nuwaubian Nation of Moors" (after the move to Georgia), "Yamassee Native American Moors of the Creek Nation" (also used in Georgia when York claimed indigenous ancestry via Egyptian migration and intermarriage with the ancient Olmec), and "Nuwaubian Nation of Moors".

Founder 

The Nuwaubian Nation was centered exclusively on the person of its founder, Malachi (Dwight) York, who legally changed his name several times, and has used dozens of aliases.

York was born on June 26, 1935 (also reported as 1945). He began his ministry in the late 1960s, from 1967 preaching to a group he called the Pan-African "Nubians" (viz. African Americans) in Brooklyn, New York City, New York.

York founded numerous esoteric or quasi-religious fraternal orders under various names during the 1970s and 1980s, at first along pseudo-Islamic lines, later moving to a loose Afrocentric ancient Egypt theme, eclectically mixing ideas taken from black nationalism, cryptozoology, and UFO religions and popular conspiracy theories. During the 1980s, he was also active as a musician as Dr. York, recording for Passion Records.

York published some 450 booklets (dubbed "scrolls") under numerous pseudonyms. During the late 1990s, he styled himself a messianic founder-prophet of his movement, sometimes claiming divine status or extraterrestrial origin, appearing on his Savior's Day celebrations at Tama-Re.

York was arrested in May 2002, and in 2003 he pleaded guilty to child sexual abuse after being indicted on 197 counts of child molestation, including charges of sex trafficking of minors across state lines. These minors were as young as 8 years old. He was imprisoned. In 2004, he was convicted to a 135-year sentence for transporting minors across state lines in the course of sexually molesting them, racketeering, and financial reporting charges. His convictions were upheld on appeal. York's case was reported as the largest prosecution for child molestation ever directed at a single person in the history of the United States, both in terms of number of victims and number of incidents. The case was described in the book Ungodly: A True Story of Unprecedented Evil (2007) by Bill Osinski, a reporter who had covered the Nuwaubians in Georgia during the late 1990s.

Some factions of the Black supremacist subculture in the United States appeared to continue to support York as of 2010, portraying his conviction as a conspiracy by the "White Power Structure". Malik Zulu Shabazz, chairman of the New Black Panther Party and York's lawyer, described York as "a great leader of our people [… and] victim of an open conspiracy by our enemy."

History 
During the 1970s, the group set up bookstores and chapters in Trinidad; Baltimore, Maryland; and Washington, D.C. According to former follower Saadik Redd, York had between 2,000 and 3,000 followers during the 1970s. Its headquarters was in Bushwick, Brooklyn, until 1983. A portion of the community moved to Sullivan County, New York, to a site they called Camp Jazzir Abba. More people stayed in Brooklyn until about 1991.

A Muslim cleric, Bilal Philips, published The Ansar Cult in America in 1988, denouncing the movement as un-Islamic. Phillips relied heavily on testimonies of former adherents in describing the group's beliefs and practices.

In the late 1980s, York borrowed from numerous religious and esoteric traditions beyond Islam, creating the "Nuwaubian" movement. York styled his movement in a mixture of Ancient Egypt and Native American themes. He legally changed his name again, from "Issa Al Haadi Al Mahdi" to "Malachi York," effective March 12, 1993.

Former follower Robert J. Rohan had a critical view of York's changes, as noted in this interview:

After moving to Georgia, York and his followers claimed affiliation with Masons and with the Jewish, Christian and Egyptian faiths.
"Once he started changing religious ideas, the older followers became skeptical and left the group," Rohan said. "That was what happened to me."

Among its themes, the Nuwaubians borrowed a claim to indigenous ancestry, perhaps from the Washitaw Nation (a Louisiana Black separatist group led by an eccentric 'empress'). They claimed to be indigenous people, named Yamasee (claiming affiliation with the confederation of Muscogee (Creek) Native American nations in the Georgia area) as well as "Moors." They claimed a prehistoric migration to America "before the continents drifted apart". At this point, the group called itself "Yamassee Native American Moors of the Creek Nation". During the early 2000s, York presided at Tama-Re styled as "Our Own Pharoah NETER A'aferti Atum-Re", leader and chief mystagogue of "The Ancient Egiptian Order."

Reception

Political influence in Georgia 
Initially the Nuwaubians were considered eccentric but tolerable. Tensions began to increase locally when the group distributed leaflets attacking whites and claiming racial persecution in a zoning conflict. They had set up a nightclub in a warehouse on their property. They alienated many residents of the area, both black and white. In 1998, the county sought an injunction against construction and uses that violated zoning. At the same time, the Nuwaubian community increased its leafletting of Eatonton and surrounding areas, charging white officials with racial discrimination and striving to increase opposition to them. Threats mounted and an eviscerated dog carcass was left at the home of the county attorney.

Within Putnam County, the Nuwaubians lost black support, in part by trying to take over the NAACP chapter. But outside, they appealed to national activists, claiming to be racially persecuted in the county. In 1999, Al Sharpton visited Tama-Re to express his support for the Nuwaubians. During this period, the group maintained Holy Tabernacle stores "in more than a dozen cities in the U.S., the United Kingdom and Trinidad," and continued to gain revenues from them. York purchased a $557,000 mansion for his own use in Athens, Georgia, about 60 miles away, where the University of Georgia is located.

In 2001, the group put up their own candidates, associated with the Republican Party, for public office, including sheriff. Their candidates were defeated.

In conjunction with a Nuwaubian Nation parade held in Augusta, Georgia, in February 2001, the office of Augusta mayor Bob Young (1999–2005) published a proclamation written by the Nuwaubian organization, stating the group's beliefs. Quotes include "the Nuwbuns were the dark, brown-to-black-skin, wooly-hair original Eygyptians." "[T]he Black race's greatness has been accepted in America and many books as people of Timbuktu Africa or the Olmecians from Uganda, Africa, who migrated and walked here to North and South America to set up colonies way before the continental drift."

In an interview with a reporter from The Augusta Chronicle, Mayor Young said that he had not personally read the statement prior to its release. He explained that his office customarily releases proclamations drafted and submitted for publication by civic groups without subjecting them to substantial content review. He suggested that such proclamations do not constitute official positions of the mayor's office or statements of the mayor's views.

On May 8, 2002, Tama-Re was raided by a joint force of FBI and ATF agents, state police, and local law enforcement. Although there were fears that the raid would end in violence, no shots were fired during the operation, although tear gas was used by the FBI's Hostage Rescue Team.

York, along with his wife, was arrested outside of the property the same day on federal charges of child molestation and racketeering, including transport of minors for sexual use. He was convicted in 2004 by a jury in federal court and sentenced to 135 years in federal prison. His appeal failed, and the US Supreme Court declined to hear the last appeal. Tama-Re was sold in asset forfeiture under the verdict, and the new owners demolished the structures. With the revelations of York's conduct, most followers abandoned the group, although some factions of the Nuwaubian Nation still exist.
 
York is currently incarcerated in ADX Florence, a maximum-security federal prison in Florence, Colorado. He will be eligible for parole in 2122.

In 2004, seven officers of the Macon, Georgia, police department resigned from their jobs in protest against the prosecution of York. Five of those officers were later hired by the Clarke County, Georgia, jail as guards. Four of them were fired in 2006 (the fifth resigned) in the wake of charges that they were smuggling Nuwaubianist literature into the jail, corresponding with the prisoner York, encouraging inmates to rebel against white guards, and showing favoritism to Nuwaubian prisoners. The jail commander was fired after he began an investigation of Nuwaubianist influence at the jail. He has said he believes that he was fired because he undertook this investigation.

Influence upon hip-hop 
As "Dr. York," the movement leader was active as a vocalist and music producer in Brooklyn before leaving the area. During this time, his Nuwaubian teachings had an effect upon hip hop and Black culture in New York. Journalist Adam Heimlich of the New York Press suggested the following were influenced by York: Jaz-O, Doug E. Fresh, Afrika Bambaataa, Posdnuos from De La Soul, Prodigy from Mobb Deep, and MF Doom/KMD.

In his article on York's cult, Heimlich reviewed some of the leader's published works. He wrote that York had borrowed from a variety of sources for his ideas:

Among the indie hip hop ranks, there are Nuwaubians who perform what they call Nu-wop, such as Daddi Kuwsh, Twinity, Nefu Amun Hotep, 9thScientist, Scienz of Life, Ntelek, Jedi Mind Tricks, Aslaam Mahdi, 720 Pure Sufi, Tos El Bashir and The Lost Children of Babylon. On Where Light's "Swords of Malachai", Rasul lets loose: 'When my tongue swings in the form of a double-edged sword, it brings forth Nuwaubu, which is right Knowledge, wisdom and understanding.'"

In an article for Honor Nation, A. L. JakeAl Reum speculated that the controversial Native American kitsch costumes and props from OutKast's 46th Annual Grammy Awards performance in 2004 were inspired by the Nuwaubian belief about the Native Americans being "Moors" in origin.

Beliefs 
Southern Poverty Law Center described the Nuwaubianism belief system as "mix[ing] black supremacist ideas with worship of the Egyptians and their pyramids, a belief in UFOs and various conspiracies related to the Illuminati and the Bilderbergers" and quoted York's letter dated Nov. 10, 2004 as: "The Caucasian has not been chosen to lead the world. They lack true emotions in their creation. We never intended them to be peaceful. They were bred to be killers, with low reproduction levels and a short life span." Another explanation has Caucasians descend from Cain: "Adam and Eve were sent to the Aegean Islands between Asia and Europe, where they started having children, and each couple's first born child was an Albino and those Albinos are called Cain in the Bible, and Cain is short for Caucasian."

In 1994 Ghazi Y. Khankan, director of the New York office of the Council on American–Islamic Relations, commented about York and his group based on their history in Brooklyn. He said, "It's a cult, in my opinion, and in Islam there are no cults. They consider their leader a prophet, which means they have deviated from the Islamic way." The superficial similarity of York's beliefs to those of the Heaven's Gate cult led to some worried newspaper articles after that group's mass suicide during the appearance of Comet Hale–Bopp in 1997, in which the cult was reported to have said that a spacecraft was following the comet.

Pseudo-language 

York taught a number of "revealing" pseudo-etymologies of English words, for instance:
 believe be-lie-eve: to lie to Eve's children.
 Caucasian from "Carcass-Asian" meaning "Degenerated Asian"
 dyslexia from the Greek "dys" (hard, difficult or against) and the Latin "lexia" (law), meaning "to go against the law"
 god from the Hebrew letters Gomar, Oz, and Dubar, which signify "wisdom – strength – beauty"; alternately, this word comes from reversing the letters of "dog"  (NB: Hebrew does not have the equivalent of the letter O, and the names for the equivalent letters of G and D are Gimel and Dalet, respectively. When reversed the letters form the Hebrew word for Fish (דג)) 
 Jesus a combination of the words "Jah" and "Zeus"
 U.S.A. from the Egyptian word "usa" meaning "eye"

See also 
 Black supremacy
 Five-Percent Nation
 Nation of Islam
 Universal Zulu Nation

References

Further reading 
 
  reprint: Islamic Book Service (2003), .

External links 

 Nuwaubian Nightmare Washington Times by Robert Stacy McCain, June 2, 2002

 
Apocalyptic groups
Black supremacy
Cultural appropriation
Pseudohistory
Cults
Putnam County, Georgia
Religious syncretism
Post–civil rights era in African-American history
Religious belief systems founded in the United States
UFO religions
Islamic new religious movements